Brewer High School may refer to:
Brewer High School (Fort Worth, Texas)
Brewer High School (Maine)
Albert P. Brewer High School (Somerville, Alabama)